Shah Hussain Khan is a Pakistani politician who had been a Member of the Provincial Assembly of Khyber Pakhtunkhwa, from 2002 to May 2018.

Political career

He was elected to the Provincial Assembly of the North-West Frontier Province as a candidate of Muttahida Majlis-e-Amal (MMA) from Constituency PF-60 (Batagram-II) in 2002 Pakistani general election. He received 7,176 votes and defeated a candidate of Pakistan Muslim League (Q) (PML-Q).

He was re-elected to the Provincial Assembly of the North-West Frontier Province as a candidate of MMA from Constituency PF-60 (Batagram-II) in 2008 Pakistani general election. He received 10,298 votes and defeated a candidate of PML-Q.

He was re-elected to the Provincial Assembly of Khyber Pakhtunkhwa as a candidate of Jamiat Ulema-e Islam (F) from Constituency PK-60 (Batagram-II) in 2013 Pakistani general election. He received 8,382 votes and defeated an independent candidate, Zubir Khan.

References

Living people
Khyber Pakhtunkhwa MPAs 2013–2018
Jamiat Ulema-e-Islam (F) politicians
North-West Frontier Province MPAs 2002–2007
Khyber Pakhtunkhwa MPAs 2008–2013
Year of birth missing (living people)